Luise Rehling (M 16, 1913 – M 24, 1988) was a German politician of the Christian Democratic Union (CDU) and former member of the German Bundestag.

Life 
She was a member of the German Bundestag from 1949 until her death. In 1949, 1953 and 1957 she won the direct mandate in the electoral district of Hagen, in 1961 she entered parliament via the state list of the CDU North Rhine-Westphalia. From 14 April 1964 until her death she was deputy leader of the CDU/CSU parliamentary group.

Literature

References

1896 births
1964 deaths
Members of the Bundestag for North Rhine-Westphalia
Members of the Bundestag 1961–1965
Members of the Bundestag 1957–1961
Members of the Bundestag 1953–1957
Members of the Bundestag 1949–1953
Female members of the Bundestag
20th-century German women politicians
Members of the Bundestag for the Christian Democratic Union of Germany